Georgina Singleton (born 11 October 1977 in Ascot, Berkshire, England) is an English judoka who competed in the women's half-lightweight category.

Judo career
She held four British Judo Championships titles in her own division, picked up a total of thirty-nine medals in her career, including four from major international tournaments (European Championships, Summer Universiade, Commonwealth Games), and finished seventh in the 52-kg class at the 2004 Summer Olympics. Throughout most of her sporting career, Singleton trained for fifteen years at the Pinewood Judo Club in Wokingham under her personal coach and sensei Don Werner (who died in January 2014). A graduate of the University of Bath, she also worked as a math teacher.

Singleton reached the pinnacle of her sporting career at the 2002 European Judo Championships in Maribor, Slovenia, where she defeated Spain's Ana Carrascosa in a convincing fashion to take home the half-lightweight division title. When the city of Manchester hosted the Commonwealth Games two months later, Singleton delighted the English crowd with another overwhelming victory over Northern Ireland's Lisa Bradley in the same division.

At the 2004 Summer Olympics in Athens, Singleton qualified for Team GB in the women's half-lightweight class (52 kg), by placing fifth at the World Championships in Osaka, Japan, and securing a place with her performance from the British judo trials in Wolverhampton. Singleton got off to a firm start with convincing victories over Brazil's Fabiane Hukuda and Venezuela's Flor Velázquez in the prelims, before she conceded with a shido penalty and then succumbed to an ippon hold from Japan's Yuki Yokosawa during their quarterfinal match. In the repechage round, Singleton edged past North Korea's Ri Sang-Sim with an uchi mata makikomi (inner thigh wraparound) hold to permit herself a chance for an Olympic medal, but her rigid form was not enough to combat Belgium's Ilse Heylen in their subsequent match, relegating Singleton into the seventh position.

Singleton sought her third Olympic bid in Beijing, but finished fifth at the European Championships in Lisbon, effectively missing her chance to compete for the Games due to the qualification rules.

References

External links
 

1977 births
Living people
English female judoka
Olympic judoka of Great Britain
Judoka at the 2004 Summer Olympics
Judoka at the 2002 Commonwealth Games
Commonwealth Games gold medallists for England
People from Ascot, Berkshire
Commonwealth Games medallists in judo
Universiade medalists in judo
Universiade bronze medalists for Great Britain
Medalists at the 1999 Summer Universiade
Medallists at the 2002 Commonwealth Games